George Harold Chance (25 December 1896 – 11 July 1952) was an English professional footballer of the 1920s. Born in Stourbridge, he joined Gillingham from Bristol Rovers in 1924 and went on to make 40 appearances for the club in The Football League, scoring four goals. He joined Millwall in 1925, making 191 appearances and scoring 24 goals.

References

1896 births
1952 deaths
English footballers
Sportspeople from Stourbridge
Gillingham F.C. players
Bristol Rovers F.C. players
Millwall F.C. players
Association footballers not categorized by position